Monikh (also Romanized as Monīkh, Monnīkh, and Munīkh) is a village in Howmeh-ye Sharqi Rural District, in the Central District of Khorramshahr County, Khuzestan Province, Iran. At the 2006 census, its population was 1,500, in 270 families.

References 

Populated places in Khorramshahr County